Glaphyria citronalis is a moth in the family Crambidae. It was described by Herbert Druce in 1899. It is found from south-eastern Mexico south to Central America and Brazil.

There are four transverse yellow apical streaks on the forewings.

References

Moths described in 1899
Glaphyriini